Goose Island is a small (2 ha), rocky island lying about 550 m from the northern end of the much larger Wardang Island, off the west coast of the Yorke Peninsula, in the Spencer Gulf of South Australia.  Rising to a height of 26 m, its vegetation is dominated by African boxthorn on clay and calcarenite soils.  The waters surrounding the island are protected in the Goose Island Aquatic Reserve. The island is leased from the Department of Environment, Water and Natural Resources by Scotch College and is co-managed by the two parties.

Flora and fauna

Flora
Vegetation on Goose Island has degraded by activity such as grazing by feral goat and of 2009 was dominated by African boxthorn.  Other introduced species include common iceplant, Capeweed great brome grass, slender thistle false caper and hedge mustard.  Intact stands of native plants are found around the coastline including nitre-bush and marsh saltbush shrubland. Other native species include ruby saltbush, Australian hollyhock, climbing lignum, variable groundsel and bower spinach.

Fauna
Goose Island provides habitat for seabird species such as black-faced cormorants, little penguins, pied cormorants, pied oystercatchers and sooty oystercatchers. Crested terns and silver gulls also inhabit and breed on the island. Reptiles recorded included marbled geckoes, three species of skink, sleepy lizards (Tiliqua rugosa) and tiger snakes (Notechis scutatus).  The island is also a haul out area for Australian sea lions.  Introduced species such as cat, feral pigeon, goat, house mouse and rabbit have been present in the past and as of 2009, have been either eradicated, reduced or controlled.

Little penguins
Little penguins are also known to breed on Goose Island, and have been seen there since at least 1935, when they were reported coming ashore "in great numbers" at night, and occupying burrows by day. They were also reported by visitors in 1950.

Alternative names 
Some of the islands of the Goose Island group have alternative names. Little Goose Island bears the gazetted name of Cormorant Island while Seal Rocks are also known as The Scarles. Goose Island proper is sometimes referred to as Big Goose Island.

Scotch College 
The island is leased by Scotch College and is visited by groups of Year 10 students from the school. Students camp on the island and engage in various aquatic and nature-based activities as part of their outdoor education program. These include sailing, kayaking, studying wildlife, land regeneration, snorkeling through shipwrecks and swimming with sea lions. The island's management is the shared responsibility of the lessee and the Department of Environment, Water and Natural Resources. Management activities include controlling feral animals and the eradication of introduced plant species, most notably African boxthorn.

Protected area status
Goose Island is located within the extent of the Goose Island Conservation Park while the waters surrounding its shores are part of the Goose Island aquatic reserve and the Eastern Spencer Gulf Marine Park.

See also
Goose Island (disambiguation)
List of islands of Australia
List of little penguin colonies

References

Islands of South Australia
Spencer Gulf
Penguin colonies